Battersea Park (originally Battersea) was a railway station on the London, Brighton and South Coast Railway (LB&SCR) located close to the River Thames immediately to the south of Victoria Railway Bridge (now Grosvenor Bridge) on the east side of Battersea Park in Battersea, south-west London. It opened on 1 October 1860 and changed its name to "Battersea Park" on 1 July 1862. The station was closed on 1 November 1870 when the LB&SCR started to use Grosvenor Road railway station on the north side of the river.

The station should not be confused with the current Battersea Park station, opened as "York Road" in 1867, or with another station named "Battersea" on the West London Extension Railway that was opened in 1863 and closed in 1940. The station is recorded in Course (1963) as "Battersea Park and Steamboat Pier station".

See also 
Battersea Park Road railway station

References

   
 
 

Disused railway stations in the London Borough of Wandsworth
Former London, Brighton and South Coast Railway stations
Railway stations in Great Britain opened in 1860
Railway stations in Great Britain closed in 1870